The New South Wales Minister for Hospitality and Racing is a minister in the Government of New South Wales with responsibilities for the oversight of hospitality and for racing in the state of New South Wales, Australia.

The current Minister is Kevin Anderson, who also serves as the Minister for Lands and Water. The minister assists the Minister for Tourism and Sport, Stuart Ayres. Both ministers serve in the second Perrottet ministry, with effect from 21 December 2021.

Role and responsibilities
Racing became a portfolio for the first time in the Unsworth ministry. The minister was responsible for regulating bookmakers and the control of greyhound, trotting and horse racing, racecourse development and the management of the NSW Totalisator Agency Board. With the establishment of the Sydney Harbour Casino in 1995, the portfolio included the Casino Control Board.  The portfolio was abolished in the Second Berejiklian ministry and responsibility shared by the Minister for Customer Service and the Minister for Better Regulation and Innovation, before being re-established in the second Perrottet ministry.  In addition to racing and gambling, the minister is also responsible for registered clubs.

List of ministers
The following individuals have served as Minister for Hospitality and Racing, or any precedent title:

See also 

List of New South Wales government agencies

Notes

References

Hospitality and Racing
Horse racing in Australia
Harness racing in Australia